Tyntynder South is a locality in the Rural City of Swan Hill, Victoria, Australia. Eastburn's post office opened in 1902, was renamed Tyntynder South in July 1911 and closed on 30 June 1969.

References

Towns in Victoria (Australia)
Rural City of Swan Hill